The 2019 North District Council election was held on 24 November 2015 to elect all 18 elected members to the 20-member North District Council of Hong Kong.

The pro-democrats took control of the council by taking 15 seats in a historic landslide victory amid the massive pro-democracy protests. The pro-Beijing parties almost lost all their seats, retaining only three seats with DAB's Lau Kwok-fan also being unseated.

Overall election results
Before election:

Change in composition:

References

External links
 Election Results - Overall Results

2019 Hong Kong local elections